|}

The Bluebell Stakes is a Listed flat horse race in Ireland open to thoroughbred fillies and mares aged three years or older. It is run at Naas Racecourse over a distance of 1 mile and 4 furlongs (2,414 metres), and it is scheduled to take place each year in October.

The race was first run in 2015.

Winners

See also
 Horse racing in Ireland
 List of Irish flat horse races

References
Racing Post:

Flat races in Ireland
Long-distance horse races for fillies and mares
Naas Racecourse
Recurring sporting events established in 2015
2015 establishments in Ireland